Qarabağlar ( or ) is a village and the most populous municipality in the Kangarli District of Nakhchivan, Azerbaijan. It has a population of 1,143.

References 

Populated places in Kangarli District